Thomas Greiner (born 3 May 1963) is a retired German rower who won a gold medal in the coxless fours at the 1988 Summer Olympics. He also won four gold and three bronze medals in various events at the world championships of 1982–1990.

Greiner is a tax consultant and an international rowing referee. He is married and has two children. For his Olympic achievement, in 1988 he was awarded the Patriotic Order of Merit. In 1991, Greiner became the second person to receive the Thomas Keller Medal, the highest honor in rowing.

References

1963 births
Living people
Rowers from Dresden
People from Bezirk Dresden
East German male rowers
Olympic rowers of East Germany
Rowers at the 1988 Summer Olympics
Olympic gold medalists for East Germany
Olympic medalists in rowing
World Rowing Championships medalists for East Germany
Medalists at the 1988 Summer Olympics
Thomas Keller Medal recipients
Recipients of the Patriotic Order of Merit in gold